René Beaumont (born 29 February 1940 in Lyon) is a French politician. He was a member of the Union for French Democracy and is currently a member of the Union for a Popular Movement. A veterinarian by profession, he has also been a senator from Saône-et-Loire since 26 September 2004.

Other positions 
 Adjunct to the mayor of Varennes-Saint-Sauveur
 President of the Communauté de communes du Canton de Cuiseaux

Former positions 
 Deputy of Saône et Loire from 1986 to 1988, then deputy of the 6th district (Louhans) from 1988 to 1997, lost in 1997 to Arnaud Montebourg ;
 President of the Conseil Général de Saône-et-Loire from 1985 to 2004 ;
 Mayor of Varennes-Saint-Sauveur from 1970 to 2001.

External links 
René Beaumont's webpage on the Senate site

1940 births
Living people
Politicians from Lyon
Politicians from Auvergne-Rhône-Alpes
Union for French Democracy politicians
Union for a Popular Movement politicians
Modern and Humanist France
Deputies of the 8th National Assembly of the French Fifth Republic
Deputies of the 9th National Assembly of the French Fifth Republic
Deputies of the 10th National Assembly of the French Fifth Republic
French Senators of the Fifth Republic
Senators of Saône-et-Loire
Mayors of places in Bourgogne-Franche-Comté